Carmine Valentino Coppola (June 11, 1910 – April 26, 1991) was an American composer, flautist, pianist, and songwriter who contributed original music to The Godfather, The Godfather Part II, Apocalypse Now, The Outsiders, and The Godfather Part III, all directed by his son Francis Ford Coppola. In the course of his career, he won both Academy Award for Best Original Score and Golden Globe Award for Best Original Score  with BAFTA Award and Grammy Award nominations.

Personal life
Coppola was born in New York City, the son of Maria (née Zasa) and Agostino Coppola, who came to the United States from Bernalda, Basilicata. His brother was opera conductor and composer Anton Coppola. He was the father of August Coppola, Francis Ford Coppola and Talia Shire, and grandfather of Nicolas Cage, Sofia Coppola, Roman Coppola, Jason Schwartzman, Robert Schwartzman, and the late Gian-Carlo Coppola.

His wife, Italia, died in 2004 in Los Angeles. Coppola died in Northridge, California, at the age of 80 in 1991. Both Coppola and his wife are buried at San Fernando Mission Cemetery.

Career
Coppola played the flute. He studied at Juilliard, later at the Manhattan School of Music and privately with Joseph Schillinger. During the 1940s, Coppola worked under Arturo Toscanini with the NBC Symphony Orchestra. Then in 1951, Coppola left the Orchestra to pursue his dream of composing music. During that time he mostly worked as an orchestra conductor on Broadway and elsewhere, working with his son, filmmaker Francis Ford Coppola, on additional music for his Finian's Rainbow.

Carmine contributed to the music performed in the wedding scene in The Godfather (1972). Later, his son called on him to compose additional music for the score of The Godfather Part II (1974), in which he and his father received an in-movie tribute with the characters Agostino and Carmine Coppola, who appear in a deleted scene from the young Vito Corleone flashback segments. Principal score composer Nino Rota and Carmine together won Oscars for Best Score for the film.  He also composed most of the score for The Godfather Part III (1990). He made cameo appearances in all three Godfather films as a conductor.

Carmine and Francis together scored Apocalypse Now (1979), for which they won a Golden Globe Award for best original score. He also composed a three-and-a-half-hour score for US showings of Kevin Brownlow's reconstruction of Abel Gance's 1927 epic Napoléon. Carmine composed the music for The Black Stallion (1979), on which Francis was executive producer, and four other films directed by his son in the 1980s. In his audio commentary on The Godfather Part III DVD, Francis said that his father missed a cue during the shooting of that film's opening wedding reception—something he never did in his prime.  At that point, Francis realized that his father had little time left. As it turned out, Carmine died less than four months after Part III premiered, of a stroke.

Filmography

Collaborations with Francis Ford Coppola

Collaboration with other directors

See also
Coppola family tree

References

External links

The Black Stallion By Gary S Dalkin
Soundtrack BY MSN Music

1910 births
1991 deaths
American people of Italian descent
People of Campanian descent
People of Lucanian descent
20th-century American composers
20th-century classical musicians
American classical flautists
American film score composers
Best Original Music Score Academy Award winners
Golden Globe Award-winning musicians
Burials at San Fernando Mission Cemetery
Carmine
Juilliard School alumni
American male film score composers
Manhattan School of Music alumni
Musicians from New York City
20th-century American male musicians
20th-century flautists